Michele Mary Smith (born June 21, 1967) is an American, former collegiate All-American, two-time medal-winning Olympian, international professional left-handed hitting fastpitch softball pitcher and current sports commentator, originally from Califon, New Jersey. Smith played her college career for the Oklahoma State Cowgirls for the years 1986–89, where she set numerous records in the now defunct Big Eight Conference. She is also a double Olympic Softball gold medalist with Team USA, having played in the 1996 and 2000 Summer Olympics. She has been ESPN's lead college softball color analyst since 1998. In 2012, Smith became the first woman to serve as commentator for a nationally televised Major League Baseball game. Smith is a USA Softball Hall of Fame honoree.

Early life and education 
Smith started playing softball at the age of five. She attended Voorhees High School in Glen Gardner, New Jersey, where she set school records for wins, strikeouts and no-hitters. She continued her pitching career at Oklahoma State University, earning a Bachelor of Science in health and wellness.

On July 21, 1986, while Smith's father was driving her home from an oral surgeon's appointment, the sleeping Smith was thrown from the truck when her door opened on a turn. She was thrown into a roadside post, chopping off part of her elbow bone and tearing her triceps from her left arm, which severed the muscle and nerve endings in her golden pitching arm. The accident forced her to not only face the trauma of her injury, but also the end of her life as she had known it. "It was like losing my identity," she says. Her life was far from over: after nine intensive months of rehab she made her comeback as a pitcher at Oklahoma State University. She returned throwing 3 mph faster than before the accident.

Oklahoma State Cowgirls 
Smith debuted in 1986 and led the team in wins and batting average to earn First-Team Big Eight Conference honors. For her sophomore year, she posted a top-5 school season ERA to lead the team.

For her junior year, Smith was named a National Fastpitch Coaches Association First-Team All-American to accompany her second top conference honors. She broke school records for strikeouts, shutouts and wins while also posting career bests in average, RBIs, hits, slugging percentage, walks and home runs, the latter of which she tied for the NCAA lead that year. Smith also pitched four no-hitters, the first coming on March 6 over the Sam Houston State Bearkats.

In her final year, Smith achieved top honors from both the conference and the NFCA for a second straight year. She also attained a conference pitching Triple Crown for leading in wins, strikeouts and ERA, all being career bests. Her strikeouts, shutouts and strikeout ratio (8.5) totals were then new school records; the ratio was atop the NCAA list for that year. Smith added five more no-hitters, two of them perfect games; the total overall tied the second most for an NCAA season (now top-5) and gave her 9 overall to rank top-5 for an NCAA career. She is still tied for 10th most on the NCAA list.

Smith set a career and school high with 17 strikeouts in a 2–0 regulation win vs. the Louisiana Tech Lady Techsters on April 15. She led the Cowgirls to a No. 2 ranking at the 1989 Women's College World Series, where she opened with a 15-strikeout, three-hitter against the Toledo Rockets on May 25. Following a shutout of the Arizona Wildcats the team lost back-to-back games on May 27, with the Fresno State Bulldogs eliminating them from the series. Smith would earn All-Tournament honors for her performance.

Smith graduated with the crown in wins, strikeouts, shutouts, innings pitched, no-hitters, perfect games, RBIs, home runs and triples for a Cowgirl career, as well as ranking top-5 in numerous other categories. She still holds the record for wins, no-hitters and perfect games.

Personal life 
Smith has also played basketball and field hockey. She is often called Smitty, Lefty, and Silky (for her "silky" arm swing).

Statistics

Oklahoma State Cowgirls

Team USA Olympic Softball

Honors 
 New Jersey State Interscholastic Athletic Association Hall of Fame (1998)
 Shasta County, California Sports Hall of Fame
Amateur Softball Association Hall of Fame (2006)
 Eight-time Japan Pro Softball League champion and MVP

Associated teams 
 Team USA, 1992–2002
 Redding Rebels, 1993–1995
 Toyota Shokki (Japanese Professional Softball League), 1993–2008
 New York/New Jersey Juggernaut (NPF), 2001 and 2004

See also 
 List of Oklahoma State University Olympians
 NCAA Division I softball career sub-1.00 ERA list

External links

References 

Softball players from New Jersey
Softball players at the 1996 Summer Olympics
Softball players at the 2000 Summer Olympics
Olympic gold medalists for the United States in softball
Oklahoma State University alumni
Oklahoma State Cowgirls softball players
Olympic softball players of the United States
Major League Baseball broadcasters
Softball announcers
Sportspeople from Hunterdon County, New Jersey
People from Califon, New Jersey
1967 births
Living people
Medalists at the 2000 Summer Olympics
Medalists at the 1996 Summer Olympics
American expatriate sportspeople in Japan
Voorhees High School alumni